Lü Bu (died 7 February 199), courtesy name Fengxian, was a Chinese military general, politician, and warlord who lived during the late Eastern Han dynasty of Imperial China. Originally a subordinate of a minor warlord Ding Yuan, he betrayed and murdered Ding Yuan and defected to Dong Zhuo, the warlord who controlled the Han central government in the early 190s. In 192, he turned against Dong Zhuo and killed him after being instigated by Wang Yun and Shisun Rui, but was later defeated and driven away by Dong Zhuo's followers.

From 192 to early 195, Lü Bu wandered around central and northern China, consecutively seeking shelter under warlords such as Yuan Shu, Yuan Shao and Zhang Yang. In 194, he managed to take control of Yan Province from the warlord Cao Cao with help from defectors from Cao's side, but Cao took back his territories within two years. In 195, Lü Bu turned against Liu Bei, who had offered him refuge in Xu Province, and seized control of the province from his host. Although he had agreed to an alliance with Yuan Shu earlier, he severed ties with him after Yuan declared himself emperor – treason against Emperor Xian of Han – and joined Cao and others in attacking the pretender. However, in 198, he sided with Yuan Shu again and came under attack by the combined forces of Cao and Liu, resulting in his defeat at the Battle of Xiapi in 199. He was captured and executed by strangulation on Cao's order.

Although Lü Bu is described in historical and fictional sources as an exceptionally mighty warrior, he was also notorious for his unstable behaviour. 
He switched allegiances erratically and freely betrayed his allies. He was always suspicious of others and could not control his subordinates. All these factors ultimately led to his downfall. In the 14th-century historical novel Romance of the Three Kingdoms, the details of his life are dramatised and some fictitious elements – including his romance with the fictional maiden Diaochan – are added to portray him as a nearly unchallenged warrior who was also a ruthless and impulsive brute bereft of morals.

Historical sources on Lü Bu's life
There are two official biographies of Lü Bu. The first one is in the Records of the Three Kingdoms (Sanguozhi), which was written by Chen Shou in the third century.

In the fifth century, Pei Songzhi annotated the Sanguozhi by incorporating information from other sources to Chen Shou's original work and adding his personal commentary. Some alternative texts used in the annotations to Lü Bu's biography include: Yingxiong Ji (Chronicles of Heroes and Champions), by Wang Can; Xiandi Chunqiu (Chronicles of Emperor Xian), by Yuan Wei; Wei Shi Chunqiu (Chronicles of the Ruling Family of Wei), by Sun Sheng; Cao Man Zhuan (Biography of Cao Man), by an unknown writer.

The second biography of Lü Bu is in the Book of the Later Han (Houhanshu), which was compiled by Fan Ye in the fifth century.

Physical appearance
No descriptions of Lü Bu's physical appearance exist in historical records. It was noted that he specialised in archery and horse-riding, and possessed great physical strength. He was nicknamed "Flying General" (飛將) for his martial prowess. He also owned a powerful steed known as the "Red Hare". The Cao Man Zhuan recorded that there was a saying at the time to describe Lü Bu and the Red Hare: "Among men, Lü Bu; Among steeds, Red Hare)".

Lü Bu is described as follows in the 14th-century historical novel Romance of the Three Kingdoms:

Biography

Service under Ding Yuan and defection to Dong Zhuo

Lü Bu was from Jiuyuan County (九原縣), Wuyuan Commandery (五原郡), which is near present-day Baotou, Inner Mongolia. He was known for his martial valour in Bing Province. When Ding Yuan, the Inspector (刺史) of Bing Province, was appointed as a Cavalry Commandant (騎都尉) by the Han central government and ordered to garrison at Henei Commandery, he recruited Lü Bu as a Registrar (主簿) and treated him kindly.

After the death of Emperor Ling in May 169, Ding Yuan led his troops to the capital Luoyang to assist the general He Jin in eliminating the eunuch faction. He Jin ended up being assassinated by the eunuchs instead, after which the warlord Dong Zhuo led his forces into Luoyang and occupied the capital. Dong Zhuo wanted to kill Ding Yuan and take control of Ding's troops, so he induced Lü Bu into betraying Ding and defecting to his side. Lü Bu killed Ding Yuan, cut off his head, and presented it to Dong Zhuo, who had by then seized control of the Han central government. Dong Zhuo appointed Lü Bu as a Cavalry Commandant (騎都尉) and placed much faith and trust in him. He also accepted Lü Bu as a foster son. Lü Bu was later promoted from the position of a Cavalry Commandant to a General of the Household (中郎將). He was also made a Marquis of a Chief Village (都亭侯).

Service under Dong Zhuo

In 190, a coalition of warlords led by Yuan Shao initiated a punitive campaign against Dong Zhuo in response to Dong's tyranny and monopoly of the central government. Dong Zhuo had deposed Emperor Ling's successor, Emperor Shao, earlier that year and replaced him with Emperor Xian, who was actually a puppet ruler under his control. Lü Bu defended Dong Zhuo and fought in battles against the coalition. In one battle at Yangren (陽人; believed to be near present-day Wenquan, Ruzhou, Henan), Dong Zhuo ordered Lü Bu and Hu Zhen to attack Sun Jian (one of the coalition members), but Lü Bu and Hu Zhen could not get along with each other, resulting in disorder in their army. Sun Jian used the opportunity to attack them and forced them to retreat. Within months, the coalition forces had reached the capital Luoyang. Dong Zhuo personally led an army to engage the coalition vanguard, led by Sun Jian, in the area where the tombs of the Han emperors were located, but was defeated and forced to retreat. Sun Jian then passed through Luoyang's Xuanyang Gate (宣陽城門), where he attacked Lü Bu and drove him back. Dong Zhuo was alarmed, so he decided to evacuate Luoyang and move the capital to Chang'an in the west. He sent his troops to pillage Luoyang and force its residents to move to Chang'an as well, and then had Luoyang destroyed by fire. The coalition did not pursue Dong Zhuo to Chang'an and eventually dissolved by itself in the following year.

As Dong Zhuo usually behaved rudely in front of other people, he was afraid of being assassinated, hence he often kept Lü Bu by his side as a bodyguard. Dong Zhuo also had a bad temper and was easily agitated. During his outbursts, he threw short jis at Lü Bu, but Lü Bu reacted fast and dodged the weapons. Dong Zhuo's anger subsided after that. Lü Bu was very unhappy and he bore a grudge against his foster father. At the same time, Lü Bu was tasked with guarding Dong Zhuo's central living quarters, and he had a secret affair with one of Dong's maids. He feared that Dong Zhuo would find out and felt very uneasy about it.

Earlier on, Lü Bu had been warmly received by Wang Yun, the Minister over the Masses (司徒), so he went to see Wang and complained about how Dong Zhuo almost killed him. At the time, Wang Yun and another official, Shisun Rui (士孫瑞), were plotting to get rid of Dong Zhuo so they told Lü Bu about their plan and sought his help. Lü Bu said, "But we are father and son!" Wang Yun replied, "Your family name is Lü so you have no blood relations with him. He was not concerned about you at all when you almost died, so where was the father-son bond?" Lü Bu agreed to join them and personally killed Dong Zhuo later. After Dong Zhuo's death, Wang Yun and Lü Bu took charge of the central government. Lü Bu was appointed General of Vehement Might (奮威將軍) and received the honours equivalent to those received by the Three Ducal Ministers – three high-ranking officials in the Han administration. Emperor Xian also enfeoffed him as the Marquis of Wen (溫侯).

Expulsion from Chang'an

After Dong Zhuo's death, his followers in Liang Province, led by Li Jue, Guo Si and others, formed an army to attack Chang'an when Wang Yun refused to grant them amnesty for their past activities under Dong Zhuo. Guo Si led his men to attack the city's north gate, where he met Lü Bu, who told him, "Let's not send our soldiers into battle. Instead, let's have a man-on-man fight." Lü Bu then engaged Guo Si in a duel and injured him. Guo Si's men saved their superior. Both sides withdrew their forces. Lü Bu was unable to resist the enemy so he eventually abandoned Chang'an and fled. His defeat and subsequent flight took place 60 days after Dong Zhuo's death.

Pei Songzhi commented that the "60 days" claim in the original text of the Sanguozhi was erroneous. According to other sources, Lü Bu killed Dong Zhuo on the 23rd day of the fourth month in the third year of the Chuping era (190–193) in Emperor Xian's reign, and he fled from Chang'an on the first day of the sixth month. There were no interpolated dates in between, so Lü Bu could not have spent 60 days in Chang'an after Dong Zhuo's death.

Seeking shelter under Yuan Shu
After leaving Chang'an, Lü Bu, accompanied by a few hundred horsemen and with Dong Zhuo's head tied to his saddle, passed through Wu Pass and went to join Yuan Shu in Nanyang Commandery. The Sanguozhi and the Houhanshu give differing accounts of how Yuan Shu treated Lü Bu. The former claimed that Lü Bu expected to be received warmly because he felt that he had helped Yuan Shu take revenge by slaying Dong Zhuo. However, Yuan Shu detested Lü Bu because of his duplicity so he refused to accept him. The latter stated that Yuan Shu treated Lü Bu generously, but Lü behaved arrogantly as he felt that he deserved better treatment because he had done Yuan a favour by killing Dong Zhuo. Lü Bu also allowed his men to plunder the area. Yuan Shu became worried that Lü Bu would pose a threat to him, and Lü also felt uneasy after he heard that Yuan was suspicious of him, so he left.

Joining Yuan Shao and Zhang Yang

After leaving Yuan Shu, Lü Bu then headed to northern China to join Yuan Shu's relative, Yuan Shao. He assisted Yuan Shao in attacking Zhang Yan at Changshan. Zhang Yan had thousands of elite soldiers and cavalry. Lü Bu led his subordinates Cheng Lian (成廉) and Wei Yue (魏越) and dozens of riders to raid Zhang Yan's camp, killing several enemies and then fighting their way out. They did this three to four times every day continuously for a period of over ten days and eventually defeated Zhang Yan's forces.

Lü Bu behaved arrogantly in front of Yuan Shao because he perceived that he had done the Yuans a favour by slaying Dong Zhuo. He belittled Yuan's followers and treated them with contempt. He once asked for more soldiers from Yuan Shao but was refused, after which he sent his men to plunder Yuan's territories. Yuan Shao was greatly displeased and felt that Lü Bu posed a threat to him. Lü Bu sensed that Yuan Shao was suspicious of him so he wanted to leave northern China and return to Luoyang. Yuan Shao pretended to agree and recommended Lü Bu to take up the appointment of Colonel-Director of Retainers (司隷校尉) while secretly plotting to kill him.

On the day of Lü Bu's departure, Yuan Shao sent 30 armoured soldiers to escort him and personally saw him off. Along the journey, Lü Bu stopped and rested inside his tent. That night, Yuan Shao's soldiers crept into the tent and killed the person inside, who had covered himself with a blanket, after which they reported that Lü Bu was dead. The following day, Yuan Shao received news that Lü Bu was still alive so he immediately had the gates in his city closed. In fact, Lü Bu had secretly left his tent the previous night without Yuan Shao's soldiers knowing, and had ordered one of his men to remain inside as a decoy.

Lü Bu fled to Henei Commandery to join Zhang Yang after his escape. Yuan Shao sent his men to pursue Lü Bu but they were afraid of Lü and did not dare to approach him. Zhang Yang and his subordinates were bribed by Li Jue and Guo Si to kill Lü Bu. When Lü Bu heard about it, he told Zhang Yang, "I'm from the same province as you. If you kill me, you'll become weaker. If you recruit me, you can obtain the same honours and titles as Li Jue and Guo Si." Zhang Yang pretended to agree to help Li Jue and Guo Si kill Lü Bu but he secretly offered refuge to Lü instead. When Li Jue and Guo Si learnt that Zhang Yang had accepted Lü Bu, they became worried so they sent an imperial decree to Henei in Emperor Xian's name, appointing Lü Bu as the Administrator (太守) of Yingchuan Commandery.

The account of Lü Bu's association with Zhang Yang in the Sanguozhi differed slightly from that recorded in the Houhanshu. The former mentioned that Lü Bu joined Yuan Shao after he was rejected by Yuan Shu, and then he sought shelter under Zhang Yang after Yuan Shao sent assassins to kill him. In the Houhanshu, however, it was stated that Lü Bu went to join Zhang Yang after leaving Yuan Shu, and he managed to persuade Zhang to ignore Li Jue and Guo Si's urgings to kill him and instead provide him refuge. He left Zhang Yang later and went to join Yuan Shao, but returned to Zhang again after surviving the assassination attempt. On his way to Henei, Lü Bu passed by Chenliu (陳留; around present-day Kaifeng, Henan), where its Administrator, Zhang Miao, received him warmly. Zhang Miao made a pledge of friendship with Lü Bu when he saw him off from Chenliu.

Battle of Yan Province

Yuan Shao was furious when he heard that Zhang Miao – whom he had a feud with – had become Lü Bu's friend. Around the time, Yuan Shao was still an ally of Cao Cao, so Zhang Miao feared that Cao would combine forces with Yuan to attack him. Besides, Zhang Miao's jurisdiction, Chenliu, was in Yan Province, which was under Cao Cao's control.

In 194, when Cao Cao left Yan Province to attack Xu Province, Zhang Miao's younger brother Zhang Chao (張超), along with Cao's subordinates Chen Gong, Xu Si (許汜) and Wang Kai (王楷), started a rebellion. Chen Gong persuaded Zhang Miao to join them in welcoming Lü Bu into Yan Province. With help from the defectors, Lü Bu seized control of Puyang and declared himself the Governor (牧) of Yan Province. The various commanderies and counties in Yan Province responded to Lü Bu's call and defected to his side, except for Juancheng, Dong'e and Fan counties, which still remained under Cao Cao's control.

Upon receiving news of the rebellion and Lü Bu's intrusion, Cao Cao aborted the Xu Province campaign and led his forces back to Yan Province. The armies of Lü Bu and Cao Cao clashed at Puyang, where Cao was unable to overcome Lü, so both sides were locked in a stalemate for over 100 days. At the time, Yan Province was plagued by locusts and droughts so the people suffered from famine and many had resorted to cannibalism to survive. Lü Bu moved his base from Puyang further east to Shanyang. Within two years, Cao Cao managed to retake all his territories in Yan Province and he later defeated Lü Bu in a battle at Juye County. Lü Bu fled east to Xu Province and took shelter under Liu Bei.

Warlord of Xu Province

Seizing Xu Province from Liu Bei 

Lü Bu treated Liu Bei very respectfully when he first met him, and he said, "You and I are both from the northern borders. When I saw the Guandong Coalition rising up against Dong Zhuo, I already wanted to help them eliminate him. However, after I slew Dong Zhuo and left Chang'an, none of the former coalition members were willing to accept me. They even tried to kill me." He then brought Liu Bei to his camp, asked Liu to sit on his wife's bed, and instructed his wife to pay respect to Liu. He then threw a feast for Liu Bei and called Liu his "younger brother". Liu Bei knew that Lü Bu was unpredictable and untrustworthy, but he kept quiet and pretended to be friendly towards Lü Bu.

When Liu Bei was governing Xu Province, he was stationed in the provincial capital Xiapi  and he drew boundaries with Yuan Shu in the areas around the Huai River. When Yuan Shu learnt that Lü Bu was in Xu Province, he wanted to instigate Lü Bu to help him deal with Liu Bei, so he wrote to Lü Bu: "In the past, Dong Zhuo monopolised state power, harmed the imperial family, and murdered my family. I participated in the campaign against Dong Zhuo but did not manage to kill him. You slew Dong Zhuo and sent me his head. In doing so, you helped me take revenge and salvage my reputation. This was the first favour you did me. When Jin Yuanxiu (金元休) was heading to Yan Province to assume office, Cao Cao defeated and nearly drove him to the point of destruction. Later, you attacked Cao Cao in Yan Province and helped me regain my reputation. This was the second favour you did me. Throughout my life, I have never heard of the existence of Liu Bei, but he started a war with me. With your mighty spirit, you are capable of defeating Liu Bei, and this will be the third favour you do me. With these three favours you did me, I am willing to entrust matters of life and death to you even though I may not be worthy. You have been fighting battles for a long time and you lack food supplies. I hereby send you 200,000 hu (斛) of grain and open my doors to you. If they are insufficient, I will continue to provide you a steady flow of supplies. If you need weapons and military equipment, just ask." Lü Bu was delighted and he agreed to help Yuan Shu attack Xiapi. The contents of Yuan Shu's letter, as recorded in the Houhanshu, were slightly different and briefer as compared to that recorded in the Sanguozhi.

Lü Bu led his forces to some 40 li west of Xiapi. Xu Dan (許耽), who was from Danyang (丹楊) and was serving as a General of the Household (中郎將) under Liu Bei, sent Zhang Kuang (章誑) to meet Lü Bu at night. Zhang Kuang told Lü Bu, "Zhang Yide quarrelled with Cao Bao and killed him. The city is now in a state of chaos. There are 1,000 soldiers from Danyang stationed at the west white gate. When they heard of your arrival, they jumped for joy as if they have been revitalised. The Danyang soldiers will open the west gate for you when you reach there." Lü Bu mobilised his troops that night and reached Xiapi at dawn, where the Danyang soldiers opened the west gate for him. Lü Bu sat on the viewing platform above the gate and instructed his troops to set fire in the city. They defeated Zhang Fei and his men in battle and captured Liu Bei's family, the families of Liu's subordinates, and Liu's supplies.

Upon receiving news of Lü Bu's intrusion, Liu Bei immediately headed back to Xiapi Commandery but most of his troops scattered along the way. With his remaining men, Liu Bei moved eastward to take Guangling Commandery where Yuan Shu's forces defeated him. Liu Bei then retreated to Haixi County (海西縣; southeast of present-day Guannan County, Jiangsu). Where, in hunger and desperation, he surrendered to Lü Bu. This took place in around early 196. Lü Bu was displeased that Yuan Shu's supplies had not reached him yet, so he led his men to welcome Liu Bei. He appointed Liu Bei as the Inspector (刺史) of Yu Province and ordered him to garrison at Xiaopei, while he declared himself the Governor of Xu Province and remained in Xiapi.

Hao Meng's Rebellion 
In July or August 196, Lü Bu's subordinate Hao Meng rebelled against him and attacked his office in Xiapi. Lü Bu's general Gao Shun suppressed the rebellion with help from Cao Xing – Hao Meng's subordinate, who refused to betray Lü Bu – and killed Hao Meng. Later that year, Lü Bu used his archery skill to prevent a battle between Liu Bei and Yuan Shu's general Ji Ling from taking place. He had a ji erected at the gate of the camp, and proposed, "Gentlemen, watch me fire an arrow at the lower part of the curved blade on the ji. If I hit it in one shot, all of you must withdraw your forces and leave. If I don't, you can remain here and prepare for battle." He then raised his bow and fired an arrow at the ji, hitting exactly the lower part of the curved blade. Everyone present at the scene was shocked. They said, "General, you possess Heaven's might!" The following day, they threw another party and then withdrew their forces.

Allying with Cao Cao against Yuan Shu

Cancellation of engagement 

In early 197, Yuan Shu declared himself emperor in Shouchun, the administrative centre of his territories, and founded a Zhong (仲) dynasty. This was deemed an act of treason against the reigning Emperor Xian of the Han dynasty, so Yuan Shu soon found himself the target of attacks by Cao Cao and other warlords who had received orders from the Han imperial court to eliminate the pretender.

Earlier on, Yuan Shu wanted to form an alliance with Lü Bu so he proposed a marriage between his son and Lü Bu's daughter. Lü Bu initially agreed. After proclaiming himself emperor, Yuan Shu sent his subordinate Han Yin (韓胤) to meet Lü Bu and escort Lü Bu's daughter back to his territory for the marriage. However, Lü Bu changed his mind after Chen Gui convinced him to do so, and after he recalled how Yuan Shu rejected him when he first sought shelter under him. He then sent his men to chase Han Yin's convoy, which was on its way back to Shouchun, and retrieve his daughter. He also captured Han Yin and sent him as a prisoner to Xu, where Han Yin was executed.

Peace with Cao Cao 
The Yingxiong Ji recorded: 

The main text of the Sanguozhi, however, mentioned that the Han imperial court appointed Lü Bu as General of the Left (左將軍) instead of General Who Pacifies the East (as stated in the Yingxiong Ji). Nevertheless, Lü Bu did allow Chen Deng to go to Xu as his representative to thank the imperial court. In Xu, Chen Deng urged Cao Cao to get rid of Lü Bu and agreed to serve as a mole in Xu Province to help Cao Cao eliminate Lü Bu. Chen Deng also received a promotion while his father Chen Gui got a salary increase.

When Chen Deng returned to Xu Province, an angry Lü Bu confronted him, brandished his ji at him and said, "Your father advised me to side with Cao Cao and reject Yuan Shu's offer. Now, (after following his advice,) I have gained nothing, while you and your father got promoted and rewarded. You must have tricked me! What do you have to say?" Chen Deng maintained his composure and calmly replied, "When I met Cao Cao, I told him, 'You should treat the General (Lü Bu) in the same way you raise a tiger. Feed it well with meat. If it is not well-fed, it will attack people.' Cao Cao replied, 'You're wrong. He's like a hawk. If it is hungry, it will hunt for you. If it is well-fed, it will fly away.' That was what we talked about." Lü Bu's anger subsided.

War against Yuan Shu

Yuan Shu was furious that Lü Bu reneged on his word, so he allied with Han Xian and Yang Feng, and sent his general Zhang Xun (張勳) to attack Lü Bu. Lü Bu asked Chen Gui, "Yuan Shu sends his forces to attack me because I followed your suggestion. What should I do now?" Chen Gui replied, "The alliance between Han Xian, Yang Feng and Yuan Shu is formed by a loose assembly of their forces. They have not decided on a common plan so they will not last long. They are like chickens tied up together and they cannot move in tandem. My son, Deng, has a plan to separate them."

Lü Bu heeded Chen Gui's advice and sent a letter to Han Xian and Yang Feng, "You two generals escorted the Emperor in Luoyang, while I personally killed Dong Zhuo. We have all accomplished deeds worthy of praise. Yuan Shu has committed treason, so everyone should attack him. Why do you side with the traitor instead and join him in attacking me? We should combine forces to defeat Yuan Shu, help the Emperor eliminate this traitor, and achieve glory. We should not lose this opportunity now." He also promised to share the spoils of war with them. Han Xian and Yang Feng were pleased and they agreed to help Lü Bu. They defeated Zhang Xun at Xiapi and captured Qiao Rui (橋蕤), one of Yuan Shu's officers. Yuan Shu's forces suffered heavy casualties and many of his soldiers fell into the river and drowned.

Lü Bu, Han Xian and Yang Feng later led their forces to attack Shouchun, the capital of Yuan Shu's territories, travelling on both land and water. They plundered the lands along their journey. By the time they reached Zhongli (鍾離; around present-day Chuzhou, Anhui), they had made much gains so they retreated. Before crossing the Huai River back to the north, Lü Bu left Yuan Shu a letter: "You think that your army is powerful and you always boast of having mighty warriors under your command. You wanted to destroy me, but why did you change your decision every time? I may not be courageous, but I have dominated the Huainan region. Within a short period of time, you have become like a rat scurrying for shelter in Shouchun and you cannot emerge again. Where are your mighty warriors? You enjoy telling lies to everyone, but you cannot make everyone believe you. Since ancient times, people have employed the technique of sowing discontent between their enemies to overcome them. I am not the first person to use this strategy. I am still nearby so I can wait for your response." After Lü Bu crossed the Huai River, Yuan Shu personally led 5,000 soldiers to the riverbank. Lü Bu's forces, which were on the opposite end, laughed at their enemy and retreated.

Conflict with Zang Ba
Around the time, Xiao Jian (蕭建) served as the Chancellor (相) of Langya State and was stationed in Ju County. Xiao Jian, a conservative man, did not have any contact with Lü Bu. Lü Bu wrote to Xiao Jian: "Initially, everyone throughout the Empire took up arms for the purpose of eliminating Dong Zhuo. I killed Dong Zhuo and headed east, where I hoped to be able to borrow troops and return west to defend the Emperor and restore the capital Luoyang. However, the warlords were fighting among themselves and none of them were concerned about the state. I am from Wuyuan (五原), which is located more than 5,000 li away from Xu Province and is somewhere in the northwestern border. As of now, I came here not to fight for the southeastern lands. Ju and Xiapi are not far from each other so it is easy to maintain communication between them. You behave like you are an emperor in a commandery and a king in a county! In the past, when Yue Yi attacked the Qi state, he conquered over 70 cities in Qi, except for Ju and Jimo because of Tian Dan. I am not Yue Yi, and neither are you Tian Dan. You can seek the counsel of wise men on this letter." After receiving Lü Bu's letter, Xiao Jian ordered Ji Jian (齎牋) to present five fine steeds as gifts to Lü Bu.

Zang Ba defeated Xiao Jian later and seized possession of his resources. When Lü Bu heard that, he wanted to lead his forces to attack Zang Ba in Ju County, but Gao Shun advised him against it, "General, you've earned yourself widespread fame for killing Dong Zhuo. Even if you remain in your current position, those near and far will still be afraid of you. You shouldn't be so reckless as to personally lead your men into battle. If you lose, the damage to your reputation won't be minimal." Lü Bu ignored him. Zang Ba heard of Lü Bu's violent and plundering ways, so he remained inside Ju County and put up a firm defence against Lü Bu. Lü Bu was unable to conquer Ju County so he withdrew his forces and returned to Xiapi. After that, the generals of Taishan bandits include Zang Ba, Sun Guan, Wu Dun, Yin Li and Chang Xi all submitted to Lü Bu, the power of Lü Bu was significantly stronger.

Battle of Xiapi

Conflict in Xiaopei 
During the year 197, Yang Feng and Han Xian were brigands who raided the area between Yang and Xu provinces and were ordered by Lü Bu to lead their troops to raid Liu Bei's supplies. However, Liu Bei successfully lured them into a trap. Yang Feng was killed while Han Xian managed to escape.

Around late 197 or early 198, Lü Bu sided with Yuan Shu. Lu Bu also ordered his soldiers to gather gold and money to buy some military horses however along the way Liu Bei led his troops and managed to capture the gold and money. In response, Lu Bu sent Gao Shun and Zhang Liao to attack Liu Bei at Peicheng. Cao Cao sent Xiahou Dun to support Liu Bei but Gao Shun defeated Liu Bei, as well as the reinforcements Cao Cao had sent to assist him.

Cao Cao's army attack Xu Province 
In the winter of 198, Cao Cao personally led a campaign against Lü Bu and besieged Xiapi. He wrote a letter to Lü Bu, explaining the benefits of submitting and the consequences of putting up resistance. Lü Bu wanted to surrender, but Chen Gong and the others knew that they had already offended Cao Cao (when they betrayed him earlier), so they urged Lü Bu to change his decision.

When Cao Cao's army reached Pengcheng, Chen Gong told Lü Bu, "We should attack the enemy now, since our troops have rested well while the enemy is weary. We're sure to win." Lü Bu replied, "Why don't we wait for them to attack first? After that we'll destroy them in the Si River." When Cao Cao's attacks increased in intensity, Lü Bu went up the White Gate Tower (白門樓; the viewing platform above the main gate in the south of Xiapi) and told his men, "Cao Cao has no intention of finding trouble with you. I should surrender to the wise lord." Chen Gong said, "The treacherous Cao Cao is no wise lord! Surrendering to him is like hitting a rock with an egg! How can you expect to live (after you surrender)?"

Lü Bu sent Xu Si (許汜) and Wang Kai (王楷) to request urgent aid from Yuan Shu. Yuan Shu said, "Lü Bu refused to send his daughter here, so it's expected that he'll meet his doom. Why does he seek help from me again?" Xu Si and Wang Kai replied, "If Your Highness doesn't save Lü Bu, you'll be courting your own doom. If Lü Bu is destroyed, Your Highness will be next." Yuan Shu then prepared his troops and claimed that he would be sending reinforcements to Lü Bu. In the meantime, Lü Bu thought that Yuan Shu was reluctant to help him because he did not send his daughter to Yuan Shu, so, one night, he tied his daughter to himself and attempted to break out of the siege. However, they encountered Cao Cao's soldiers, who fired arrows at them, so they had no choice but to return to Xiapi. Lü Bu led some 1,000 riders out of the city to engage the enemy, but lost the battle so he retreated back to Xiapi and did not dare to venture out.

Lü Bu ordered Chen Gong and Gao Shun to defend Xiapi, while he personally led some horsemen to attack Cao Cao's supply routes. However, before he left, his wife told him, "General, I know you want to attack Cao Cao's supply lines, but Chen Gong and Gao Shun can't get along with each other. If you leave, they may not work well together in defending the city. If a mishap occurs, what will become of you, General? I hope you'll consider this carefully and not be misled by Chen Gong and the others. When I was in Chang'an, you already abandoned me, but I managed to return to you because Pang Shu (龐舒) secretly protected me and kept me with him. You don't need to worry about me now." Lü Bu felt gloomy after listening to his wife and could not decide on what to do.

Chen Gong told Lü Bu, "Cao Cao has come a long way and he won't be able to last long. General, you can bring some troops with you and set up a camp outside the city, while the others and I will remain behind to defend the city. If the enemy attacks you, I'll lead the city's soldiers to attack them from behind. If they attack the city, you can reinforce the city from outside. Within ten days, the enemy's supplies will be depleted and we can defeat them easily." Lü Bu agreed with Chen Gong's idea. However, Lü Bu's wife said, "In the past, the Caos treated Gongtai (Chen Gong) like a newborn child, but he still turned against them and joined you. Now, the way you treat Gongtai is no lesser than how Cao Cao treated him, and you intend to entrust the entire city to him, along with your family, while you venture out alone? If something happens, I won't be your wife anymore!" Lü Bu then changed his mind.

The betrayal of Hou Cheng 
Yuan Shu was unable to come to Lü Bu's aid. Cao Cao could not conquer Xiapi despite pressing attacks on the city and his men were growing weary. He wanted to abort the campaign and return to Xuchang, but his advisors Guo Jia and Xun You urged him to press on. He then ordered his troops to direct the waters of the Yi (沂) and Si (泗) rivers to flood Xiapi. After a siege lasting three months, the morale of Lü Bu's forces fell drastically and his men gradually alienated him. On 7 February 199, Lü Bu's subordinates Hou Cheng, Song Xian (宋憲) and Wei Xu (魏續) captured Chen Gong and Gao Shun, and then led their troops to surrender to Cao Cao.

Lü Bu and his remaining subordinates went up the White Gate Tower and surrendered when they saw they had been surrounded. The Houhanshu recorded that Lü Bu asked his men to kill him and bring his head to Cao Cao but they refused. Lü Bu surrendered to Cao Cao immediately after.

Downfall and death

Lü Bu was tied up and brought before Cao Cao. He said, "I'm being tied up too tightly. Can you loosen the bonds?" Cao Cao replied, "A tiger must be tightly restrained." Lü Bu then said, "My lord, you dread only me, but now, since I've already submitted to you, you shouldn't have any more worries. My lord, why don't you spare me and let me help you lead your troops? In this way, you won't need to worry about not being able to pacify the Empire." When Cao Cao showed signs of reconsideration, Liu Bei interjected, "My lord, haven't you seen what Lü Bu did to Ding Jianyang and Grand Preceptor Dong?" Cao Cao rubbed his chin. Lü Bu shouted at Liu Bei, "You're the most untrustworthy person!"

Additional details about the conversation between Lü Bu and Cao Cao were recorded in other texts and they were later added by Pei Songzhi as annotations to the Sanguozhi.

The Yingxiong Ji recorded: 

The Xiandi Chunqiu recorded: 

Cao Cao had Lü Bu executed by hanging, along with Chen Gong, Gao Shun and others. Their dead bodies were later decapitated and their heads sent to the capital Xu and then buried.

Lü Bu's final moments recorded in the Houhanshu are slightly different from that recorded in the Sanguozhi, as the Houhanshu combined parts of the main text in the Sanguozhi with the Xiandi Chunqiu annotation, but the two accounts are generally similar.

Appraisal

Chen Shou, who wrote Lü Bu's biography in the Sanguozhi, commented: 

In the main text of Lü Bu's biography, while describing the events of the Battle of Xiapi, Chen Shou also wrote: 

Fan Ye, who wrote Lü Bu's biography in the Houhanshu, commented:

Family
Not much about Lü Bu's family was documented in historical texts, but it is known that he had a wife and a daughter, whose names were not recorded in history. Lü Bu abandoned his wife when he was fleeing from Chang'an, but his subordinate Pang Shu (龐舒) secretly protected her and kept her with him, and returned her to her husband later. She was most prominently mentioned during the Battle of Xiapi when she cautioned Lü Bu against overly trusting Chen Gong. Lü Bu's daughter was initially arranged to be married to Yuan Shu's son as part of an alliance between Lü and Yuan, but Lü reneged on his word and took her back when she was on her way for the marriage. When Xiapi was under siege by Cao Cao's forces, Lü Bu attempted to bring his daughter out of the city so that she could be delivered to Yuan Shu, as he hoped that Yuan would send reinforcements to him after receiving his daughter. However, Lü Bu failed to break out of the siege so he returned to Xiapi with her. The eventual fates of Lü Bu's wife and daughter are not known.

In the historical novel Romance of the Three Kingdoms, Lü Bu had two wives, a concubine, and a daughter. His concubine was Diaochan, a fictional character and Wang Yun's foster daughter. She accompanied him after he killed Dong Zhuo and was mentioned to be with him during the Battle of Xiapi. Lü Bu's first wife was Lady Yan (嚴氏), who was based on Lü Bu's real-life wife (the one mentioned in historical sources). Lü Bu's second wife, who was only mentioned by name in the novel, was a fictional daughter of Cao Bao. The role played by Lü Bu's daughter in the novel was similar to that of her counterpart in actual history. She was also unnamed in the novel, but she is called "Lü Lingqi" in video games and popular culture.

Subordinates 
 Chen Gong
 Zhang Liao
 Gao Shun
 Zang Ba
 Hao Meng
 Cao Xing
 Cheng Lian
 Song Xian
 Wei Xu
 Hou Cheng
 Zhang Miao
 Zhang Chao
 Xu Si
 Wang Kai
 Xue Lan
 Li Feng

In Romance of the Three Kingdoms 
In the 14th-century historical novel Romance of the Three Kingdoms, which dramatises the events before and during the Three Kingdoms period, Lü Bu is portrayed as a nearly invincible warrior but an incapable leader who is further marred by character flaws. While adhering to historical records in the general course of events, Luo exaggerated and sentimentalised many stories about Lü Bu, drawing inspirations from traditional operas and folklore.

See the following for some fictitious stories in Romance of the Three Kingdoms involving Lü Bu:
 Battle of Hulao Pass
 List of fictitious stories in Romance of the Three Kingdoms#Lü Bu and Diaochan
 Battle of Xiapi#In fiction

In popular culture

Because of his image as an unmatched warrior in traditional folklore and in the historical novel Romance of the Three Kingdoms, Lü Bu is often held in high regard in works based on the Three Kingdoms and even in unrelated works.

Notable actors who have portrayed Lü Bu on screen include: Zhang Guangbei in Romance of the Three Kingdoms (1994); Huang Lei in Lü Bu and Diaochan (2001); Peter Ho in Three Kingdoms (2010); Godfrey Gao in God of War, Zhao Yun (2016); Louis Koo in Dynasty Warriors (2021).

Lü Bu appears as a playable character in Koei's video games based on Romance of the Three Kingdoms, including the strategy game series of the same title as the novel, the action game series Dynasty Warriors and Warriors Orochi, and others. In the games, his name is spelled as "Lu Bu" without the double-dot over the "u" in "Lu". He also appears as a boss in the ARPG published by Koei Tecmo and developed by Team Ninja, Wolong: Fallen Dynasty. Other non-Koei titles in which Lü Bu appear include the Creative Assembly's Total War: Three Kingdoms, Capcom's Destiny of an Emperor, Neo Geo's World Heroes 2 Jet, Fate/Extra, Puzzle & Dragons, and Arena of Valor. Additionally, Lü Bu is referenced as character skins in the games Overwatch (Reaper) and League of Legends (Jarvan IV).

Lü Bu appears in the video game Fate/EXTRA as a Berserker-class Servant possessed by Rani VIII. He later appears in the same class as a Servant able to be summoned by the protagonist in the mobile game Fate/Grand Order. He reappears in Fate/Extella and Fate/Extella Link as a playable Servant.

Lü Bu appears as a girl in the manga-anime Ikki Tousen, Ryofuko-chan, and Koihime Musō. In these media, Lü Bu is usually known by the Japanese name Ryofu Hōsen.

In the collectible card game Magic: The Gathering, there is a card named "Lu Bu, Master-at-Arms", in the Portal Three Kingdoms set.

Lü Bu appears as a character in the manga Record of Ragnarok, regarded as "The Strongest Hero in the History of Mankind." He is the first combatant on the human side, and confronts the god Thor in the battle of Ragnarok. His backstory was retold as a bored man with no competition who can match his strength. He is also the main character of the spin-off manga Ryo Fu Hō Sen Hishōden.

In The God of Highschool, Lü Bu appeared as a source of borrowed power for Yu Mira. Mira's borrowed power is of the general, which is loosely based on the historical figure of the same name. This power gives her several abilities such as enhanced strength and the ability to summon a red horse (based on Red Hare, the legendary steed of Lü Bu).

Lu Bu is a playable character in the Mobile/PC Game Rise of Kingdoms.

See also
 Lists of people of the Three Kingdoms

Notes

References

Sanguozhi

Citations from the Sanguozhi 

 Chen, Shou (3rd century). Records of the Three Kingdoms (Sanguozhi).

Citations from annotations in the Sanguozhi 

 Pei, Songzhi (5th century). Annotations to Records of the Three Kingdoms (Sanguozhi zhu).

Houhanshu

Citations from the Houhanshu 

 Fan, Ye (5th century). Book of the Later Han (Houhanshu).

Other sources

 
 Luo, Guanzhong (14th century). Romance of the Three Kingdoms (Sanguo Yanyi).
 Sima, Guang (1084). Zizhi Tongjian.

199 deaths
2nd-century births
2nd-century BC executions
Chinese duellists
Dong Zhuo and associates
Executed Han dynasty people
Executed people from Inner Mongolia
Han dynasty generals from Jiangsu
Han dynasty politicians from Jiangsu
Han dynasty warlords

People executed by strangulation
People executed by the Han dynasty
People from Baotou
Politicians from Inner Mongolia
Year of birth unknown